This is a list of regiments from the U.S. state of Louisiana that fought in the Union Army during the American Civil War (1861–1865). The list of Louisiana Confederate Civil War units is shown separately.

Artillery

1st Louisiana Regiment Heavy Artillery (African Descent)
1st Louisiana Battery Light Artillery (African Descent)
2nd Louisiana Battery Light Artillery (African Descent)
3rd Louisiana Battery Light Artillery (African Descent)

Cavalry

1st Louisiana Regiment Cavalry
2nd Louisiana Regiment Cavalry

Infantry

1st Louisiana Regiment Infantry
1st Louisiana Regiment New Orleans Infantry
2nd Louisiana Regiment Infantry
2nd Louisiana Regiment New Orleans Infantry
1st Louisiana Regiment Native Guard Infantry
2nd Louisiana Regiment Native Guard Infantry
3rd Louisiana Regiment Native Guard Infantry
4th Louisiana Regiment Native Guard Infantry
5th Louisiana Regiment Infantry (African Descent)
6th Louisiana Regiment Infantry (African Descent)
7th Louisiana Regiment Infantry (African Descent)
8th Louisiana Regiment Infantry (African Descent)
9th Louisiana Regiment Infantry (African Descent)
10th Louisiana Regiment Infantry (African Descent)
11th Louisiana Regiment Infantry (African Descent)
12th Louisiana Regiment Infantry (African Descent)

Unit redesignation

See also
 Lists of American Civil War Regiments by State
 Southern Unionists
 United States Colored Troops

References

External links
The Civil War Archive, Union Regimental Index
National Park Service Civil War Soldiers and Sailors Website

 
Louisiana
Civil War